Pedro Hernández (Salamanca, 1585? – 1665) was a Spanish sculptor, drawer and engraver. He belongs to the Castilian school, being a contemporary artist of Gregorio Fernández. He mainly created religious works. His artistic language evolved from the Mannerism to a full Baroque style. He worked in the province of Salamanca.

Works

Sancti Spiritus Church
 Guardian Angel

Brotherhood of Vera Cruz
 Sainte Helena
 The Descent from the Cross
 The three Marys and the Holy Sepulchre

San Julián Church
 The Annunciation (atrib.)

Descargamaría Chapel, (Cáceres)
 Jesus carrying the cross

References 

Sculptors from Castile and León
Spanish Baroque sculptors
Spanish male sculptors
1665 deaths
Year of birth uncertain
17th-century Spanish sculptors
People from Salamanca